Nicholas Walsh (born 15 October 2002), is an Australian professional footballer who plays as a defender for Perth RedStar. He made his professional debut on 25 November 2020 against Ulsan Hyundai in the 2020 AFC Champions League.

References

External links

2002 births
Living people
Australian soccer players
Association football defenders
Perth Glory FC players
National Premier Leagues players